MetaDONE is a software environment for creating domain-specific modeling languages (DSML). MetaDONE is developed by the PReCISE Research Center of the University of Namur (Belgium). It supports multi-level modeling and is fully bootstrapped. User-defined languages can have several concrete notations that are defined  declaratively with the GraSyLa language. This framework proposes several modeling languages (Business Process Model and Notation (BPMN), User Requirements Notation (URN), Goal-oriented Requirements Language (GRL), Petri Net) that can be freely customized  by the users.

See also
 Domain-specific modelling (DSM)

External links 
 MetaDONE
 PReCISE Research Center
 URN Focus Group of ITU-T
 ITU-T Recommendation Z.150 - User Requirements Notation

Software for modeling software